Sapele Township Stadium is a multi-use stadium in Sapele, Nigeria. It is used mostly for football matches and athletics. It is the temporary home stadium of Bayelsa United F.C. The stadium has a capacity of 10,000 people.
It was finally finished in 2013 after years of delays.

References
http://www.citizenotoboh.com/2013/02/sapele-stadium-waiting-game-incorporated.html
Pictures

Football venues in Nigeria
Sport in Delta State
Bayelsa United F.C.